This is a list of mayors of the Metropolitan Borough of St Pancras, London, from 1900 to 1965. After 1965, the metropolitan borough became part of the London Borough of Camden.
 1900-02 Councillor Edmund Barnes D.L. J.P.
 1902-03 Alderman W.H. Matthews
 1903-04 Alderman Thomas Howell Williams Idris J.P.
 1904-05 Alderman Frederick Purchese
 1905-06 Councillor George Hickling
 1906-07 Alderman Donald McGregor
 1907-08 Councillor Alfred Mills
 1908-09 Councillor E.T. Heron
 1909-10 Councillor James Bryan
 1910-11 Councillor F.W. Avant
 1911-12 Alderman David Davies
 1912-13 Councillor C.A. Coggan
 1913-14 Councillor Thomas A. Collins
 1914-15 Alderman Joseph May
 1915-16 Alderman J.H. Mitchell D.L.
 1916-17 Alderman Charles W. Matthews D.L.
 1917-18 Alderman Charles Williams
 1918-19 Councillor G.F. Parsons
 1919-20 Councillor William Carter
 1920-21 Alderman H.J. Brown J.P.
 1921-22 Councillor Thomas W. McCormack
 1922-23 Alderman Harold Trill
 1923-24 Councillor R.F.W. Fincham F.C.A.
 1924-25 Councillor F.B. Gurney F.A.I.
 1925-26 Alderman Dr Edward A. Gregg
 1926-27 Councillor Rev. R. Conyers Morrell M.A.
 1927-28 Councillor Alfred Squire F.A.I.
 1928-29 Councillor E.J. Saunders
 1929-30 Councillor H.E. Capes
 1930-31 Councillor Christopher Harvey
 1931-32 Sir Alfred Davies CBE, J.P., L.C.C.
 1932-33 Alderman Sidney Bolsom F.R.G.S.
 1933-34 Councillor Frederic Hewson
 1934-35 Councillor C.H. Denyer, M.A.
 1935-37 Alderman R.F.W. Fincham F.C.A.
 1937-38 Councillor J.C.G. Sperni, M.I., Struct. E.
 1938-39 Councillor George Albert Watts
 1939-41 Alderman Evan Evans
 1941-44 Councillor E.A. Minter
 1944-45 Alderman J.H. Mitchell
 1945-46 Councillor Frank Lawrence Combes
 1946-47 Councillor Fred Powe
 1947-49 Councillor Mrs Lilian Bryant
 1949-50 Councillor J.W. Kingsley Maile
 1950-52 Councillor Sidney G. Williams
 1952-53 Councillor R.C.W. Trill
 1953-54 Councillor C.J. Ratchford, J.P.
 1954-55 Councillor Arthur Bryant A.M.I. B.E.
 1955-56 Mrs I.M.C. Bonham, M.A. L.C.C.
 1956-57 Councillor A.C. Hurst
 1957-58 Councillor T.J. Remman
 1958-59 Councillor Tom Barker, M.I. PET
 1959-60 Harold P. Bastie
 1960-61 Councillor Mrs Louise Arabia
 1961-62 Councillor Thomas Richard Morris
 1962-63 Councillor Mrs Grace F. Lee, L.C.C.
 1963-64 Councillor Mrs Hilda Chandler
 1964-65 Councillor C.J. Ratchford, J.P.

References

St Pancras, London